The 2020 FIBA Intercontinental Cup was the 29th edition of the FIBA Intercontinental Cup. The tournament was held on 7 and 9 February 2020 in San Cristóbal de La Laguna, on the Spanish island of Tenerife. It was the second time in three years the tournament is held in Tenerife after 2017.

Format
Like other years, the tournament was held under a Final Four format, played by four teams, and included a third-place game.

Teams

The tournament was contested by four teams. For the second time, the National Basketball Association (NBA) opted to send the NBA G League champions, rather than the NBA champions.

Venue

Results

Bracket

Semifinals

Third place game

Final

References

External links
 Official website
 FIBA official website
 2020 FIBA Intercontinental Cup

2020
FIBA
FIBA
International basketball competitions hosted by Spain
FIBA